Y Gwyddonydd ("The Scientist") was a Welsh-language magazine containing articles, reviews, and news items on scientific topics. It was published between 1963 and 1996 by the University of Wales Press.

The magazine has been digitized by the Welsh Journals Online project at the National Library of Wales.

References

External links
Y Gwyddonydd at Welsh Journals Online

Magazines established in 1963
Magazines disestablished in 1996
Science and technology magazines published in the United Kingdom
Welsh-language magazines
Magazines published in Wales
Defunct magazines published in the United Kingdom